Mary Schweitzer may refer to:
 Mary Higby Schweitzer, American paleontologist
 Mary Anne Schweitzer, American sports shooter